Monarch Pass (elevation ) is a high mountain pass in central Colorado, in the Rocky Mountains of the western United States.

Location and basic details

The pass carries U.S. Highway 50 over the Sawatch Range, providing a route between Tomichi Creek in the upper basin of the Gunnison River on the west and the South Arkansas River, a tributary of the Arkansas River, on the east. The pass can be traversed by all vehicles under most conditions and is generally open year-round; however, 7% grades exist, and the area is prone to heavy winter snowfall, often resulting in temporary closures during severe winter storms. Ramps for runaway trucks are located about halfway down both the eastern and western sides of the pass. Much of the highway over the pass is three-lane.

Advisory Speed Curves and Grades
Ten curves have a 35 MPH advisory speed and one curve has a 30 MPH advisory speed. The East Descent has a 6% grade for 10 miles. The West Descent has a 6% grade for 9 miles. 

Down hill from the summit, the maximum safe speed is 15 MPH for trucks with a maximum weight of 80,000 pounds. For trucks with a maximum weight of 50,000 pounds the maximum safe speed is 45 MPH.

Scenery

The pass is widely considered one of the most scenic in Colorado, offering a panoramic view of the southern end of the Sawatch Range from the summit. During the winter, visitors enjoy skiing at Monarch ski area. Monarch Mountain Lodge is located about 5 miles from the summit of the pass.

History
The current Monarch Pass is the third location on the Continental Divide to carry that name. A road traversing this first Monarch Pass was constructed in 1880 and served as an important wagon and stage road connecting the town of South Arkansas City (later Salida) on the east side with booming mining camps and the city of Gunnison on the west side. In 1922, the road was improved and rerouted to better accommodate motor vehicles. This second Monarch Pass is what is now known as Old Monarch Pass. It remained an important unpaved crossing of the divide until 1939 when yet another highway realignment was necessary.

During the 1930s, efforts were underway to complete the newly designated U.S. Route 50 across America. In Colorado, one of the more difficult challenges was the routing of the new highway over the Continental Divide. It was clear new road would need to be constructed, but there were three competing options for where to cross the divide. Marshall Pass and Cochetopa Pass, both to the south and at lower elevations, were under consideration as was Monarch Pass, the more direct route between Salida and Gunnison. In September 1938, state engineer Charles Vail decided to utilize the Monarch Pass route, but with significant reconstruction and rerouting to reduce grades, minimize tight curves, and keep the roadbed up on sunny slopes where winter snow would be easier to manage. To achieve these objectives, the road was rerouted over what was then called Agate Pass or Agate-Monarch Pass, which now serves as the third Monarch Pass.

The new U.S. Route 50 over the divide was completed, except for paving, in November 1939, and the new pass was initially designated ‘’Vail Pass’’. Area residents objected to the name, and in December 1939, Governor Ralph Carr officially designated the new pass as ‘’Monarch Pass.’’ Soon thereafter, a newly constructed pass on U.S. Route 6 crossing Colorado farther to the north was named Vail Pass.

Once a large wrecking truck overturned on the icy Monarch Pass highway. At least 100 vehicles were held up by that truck. The patrolmen called for volunteers from among the delayed motorists to lift the overturned truck back onto its wheels. In less than 15 minutes, about 50 people combined their muscle power and opened the Monarch Pass to traffic by putting the truck back on its wheels.

Weather station

An automated weather station (AWOS), provided by the Federal Aviation Administration, is located atop Monarch Pass, broadcasting at 124.175 MHz, providing pilots of small aircraft access to real-time weather conditions near the summit. The high terrain and frequent storms, however, make this route problematic for light aircraft; the pass is steep and narrow, especially when approached from the east, with a sharp turn required at the summit. Aircraft accidents in the vicinity of Monarch Pass are frequent.  Many Colorado pilots suggest that small aircraft avoid Monarch and, whenever possible, make use of the lower, flatter Marshall Pass just a few miles to the south.

On February 17, 2016 at 7:36 p.m. the weather station recorded a wind gust from the west of 148 mph, the highest official gust recorded to date in the state of Colorado by the National Weather Service (NWS). The 148 mph gust broke the previous record of 147 mph from January 25, 1971 recorded by the Center for Atmospheric Research (NCAR). Both measures confirmed by the Colorado Division of Aeronautics as well as the NWS office in Pueblo, Colorado.

References

External links
Monarch Pass, Colorado
Current road and ski conditions

Mountain passes of Colorado
Landforms of Gunnison County, Colorado
Landforms of Chaffee County, Colorado
U.S. Route 50
Great Divide of North America
Transportation in Chaffee County, Colorado
Transportation in Gunnison County, Colorado